Jonathas' Forest is a 2012 Brazilian drama film written and directed by Sergio Andrade.

The film premiered at the Festival do Rio, where participated in the competitive exhibition of Première Brazil.

Plot
Jonathas lives with his parents and his brother, Juliano, at a small farm in the rural areas of Amazonas. The brothers meet Milly, a visitor from Ukraine, and the indigenous Kedassere. The group decides to spend the weekend in a camping. Even against paternal wishes, seduced by Milly and through the woods, Jonathas takes on the most transformative of his journeys.

Cast
Begê Muniz as Jonathas
Francisco Mendes as Father
Viktoryia Vinyarska as Milly
Ítalo Castro as Juliano
Socorro Papoula as Mother
Alex Lima as Kedassere
João Tavares as Jonathas 2
David Almeida as Mateiro
Maria Maciel as Maria das Patas

Production

Development
The director Sergio Andrade said that the great challenge of the film was to show the Amazon by a perspective beyond the stereotypes. "People who aren't from here look here thinking that is a place very exotic, very mystical, and I wanted to unravel what really is our forest," he said.

Festivals
 Festival do Rio
 São Paulo International Film Festival
 Amazonas Film Festival
 International Film Festival Rotterdam
 Museum of Fine Arts, Boston
 Prague Febiofest
 Curitiba International Film Festival
 Taipei Film Festival
Maine International Film Festival

References

External links
 

2012 films
Brazilian drama films
2012 directorial debut films
2012 drama films
2010s Portuguese-language films